Secusio monteironis is a moth in the  subfamily Arctiinae. It was described by Rothschild in 1933. It is found in Angola and Mozambique.

References

Natural History Museum Lepidoptera generic names catalog

Moths described in 1933
Arctiini
Moths of Sub-Saharan Africa
Lepidoptera of Angola
Lepidoptera of Mozambique